The Mancos River, formerly also El Rio de San Lazaro, is an  northeast tributary of the San Juan River. It flows from the confluence of West Mancos River and East Mancos River near Mancos, Colorado and joins the San Juan near Four Corners Monument in New Mexico.

The river was named after an incident during which a horse rider hurt his hand while crossing, the word Mancos being derived from Spanish meaning "one-armed".

See also
List of rivers of Colorado
List of rivers of New Mexico
List of tributaries of the Colorado River

References

Rivers of Colorado
Rivers of New Mexico
Tributaries of the Colorado River in New Mexico
Tributaries of the Colorado River in Colorado
Rivers of San Juan County, New Mexico
Rivers of Montezuma County, Colorado
Old Spanish Trail (trade route)